Ben Geoffrey Charlesworth (born 19 November 2000) is an English cricketer. He made his first-class debut for Gloucestershire in the 2018 County Championship on 17 August 2018. He made his List A debut on 30 June 2019, for Gloucestershire against Australia A cricket team. In October 2019, he was named in the England under-19 cricket team's squad for a 50-over tri-series in the Caribbean. In December 2019, he was named in England's squad for the 2020 Under-19 Cricket World Cup.

References

External links
 

2000 births
Living people
English cricketers
Gloucestershire cricketers
Cricketers from Oxford
Oxfordshire cricketers
English cricketers of the 21st century